Perivola (Greek: Περιβόλα, from περιβόλι, meaning "garden") is a neighbourhood in the east-southeastern part of the city of Patras, 6 km direct and 7 km via road from the downtown core.  Perivola is linked with Patron-Klaous Road which is 3 km long.  Since 2002, it is linked with the Patras Bypass in which it was first constructed in the late-1990s.  Its interchange is approximately 1 km long.

Nearest subdivisions

Vryseika, west

Nearest places

Petroto, east
Glafkos, southeast
Demenika, southwest

Streets

Patron-Klaous Road

Geography

Its geography are filled with agricultural lands and with residential houses in the middle.  Forests are sporadically founded and several hills lie to the east.  Its total area is approximately 2 km², its length is 1 km from north to south, and from east to west.  The entire area are not flat.

Neighborhoods in Patras